Strombosiopsis is a genus of flowering plants belonging to the family Olacaceae.

Its native range is Western Tropical Africa to Uganda.

Species:

Strombosiopsis nana 
Strombosiopsis sereinii 
Strombosiopsis tetrandra

References

Olacaceae
Santalales genera